During the 1972–73 English football season, Derby County F.C. competed in the Football League First Division. As the reigning champions of the First Division, Derby would represent England in the European Cup.

Season summary

Derby County were unable to retain their title and finished in 7th place, one point off qualification for the UEFA Cup. This slump was in part due to the club's poor away form, winning only four matches away from home all season - one of the matches lost was a 5–0 defeat at Leeds United, the loss only serving to intensify the rivalry between Clough and United manager Don Revie. The club had better success in the European Cup, reaching the semi-finals before being knocked out by Juventus: Clough accused the Bianconeri of bribing the match officials — describing the Italians as "cheating bastards" at the end of the first leg match in Turin —, despite they will prove later unrelated to any attempt to combine.

At the end of the season, Kevin Hector was voted Derby's Player of the Year.

Kit

Squad

Transfers

In
Derby broke the English transfer record with the signing of half-back David Nish, from Midland rivals Leicester City, for £225,000.

  David Nish –  Leicester City, £225,000, August 1972

Out

Results

First Division

League Cup

FA Cup
 Derby County 1–1 Tottenham Hotspur
 Tottenham Hotspur 3–5 Derby County (aet) (Davies [3], Hector [2])

European Cup
 13 September 1972: Derby County 2–0  Željezničar (McFarland 38', Gemmill 53')
 27 September 1972:  Željezničar 1–2 Derby County (Sprečo 60'; Hinton 9', O'Hare 15')
 25 October 1972: Derby County 3–0  Benfica (McFarland 6', Hector 8', McGovern 40')
 8 November 1972:  Benfica 0–0 Derby County
 7 March 1973:  Spartak Trnava 1–0 Derby County (Horváth 42')
 21 March 1973: Derby County 2–0  Spartak Trnava (Hector 40', 51')
 11 April 1973:  Juventus 3–1 Derby County (Altafini 27', 84', Causio 65'; Hector 29')
 25 April 1973: Derby County 0–0  Juventus

References

External links

Derby County F.C. seasons
Derby County F.C.